Gammaduwa  is a village in Sri Lanka. It is located within Matale District, Central Province with a picturesque landscape and temperate climate. It is situated at an elevation of 931 m (3,054 ft) above sea level. The area is mildly densely populated with 532 people per km2. The population of the village, according to the 2018 census, was 5,294. Matale is the nearest city and takes about 1:20 hour by local transportation.

Local Government Council
Gammaduwa is governed by Ambanganga Korale Pradeshiya Sabha.

Climate 
April is warmest with an average temperature of 28.4 °C at noon. February is coldest with an average temperature of 15.5 °C at night. Gammaduwa has n307o distinct temperature seasons, the temperature is relatively constant during the year. The temperatures at night are cooler than during daytime. March is on average the month with most sunshine. The wet season has a rainfall peak around September, the dry season is around the month of February.

See also
List of towns in Central Province, Sri Lanka

External links

Populated places in Matale District